The Benjamin River is a tidal river in Hancock County, Maine. 
From its source, the river runs about 3 miles southwest to Eggemoggin Reach. 
The river forms part of the border between Sedgwick and Brooklin.

See also
List of rivers of Maine

References

Maine Streamflow Data from the USGS
Maine Watershed Data From Environmental Protection Agency

Rivers of Hancock County, Maine
Rivers of Maine